Bronko Nagurski Jr. (December 25, 1937March 7, 2011) was an American offensive tackle in the Canadian Football League. He was son of the famed National Football League player Bronko Nagurski.

Professional career
After playing college football at Notre Dame, Nagurski was drafted by the NFL's San Francisco 49ers in the 1959 NFL Draft, in the 10th round, 114th overall. However, he chose to play in Canada. Starting his eight-year career in the 1959 CFL season with the Hamilton Tiger-Cats, Nagurski would be a two-time all-star and played in six Grey Cup games, winning two championships.

After football
Later he worked for 35 years in human resources in the paper industry. In 2006, the 68-year-old Nagurski was diagnosed with non-Hodgkin's lymphoma. He died on March 7, 2011, at the age of 73.

External links

1937 births
2011 deaths
American players of Canadian football
Canadian football offensive linemen
Hamilton Tiger-Cats players
Notre Dame Fighting Irish football players
People from International Falls, Minnesota
Players of American football from Minnesota
American people of Polish descent
American people of Ukrainian descent